Tonite is an explosive sometimes used in the late 19th and early 20th centuries. It consists of a mixture of equal weights of barium nitrate and guncotton. The explosive was patented in 1874 by Messrs Trench, Faure, and Mackie.
The high gas pressures generated by detonation of tonite resulted in it being used as a bursting charge for some early hand grenades used in World War I.
Its name was taken from the Latin verb tonat = "it thunders", and is pronounced "toe-nite" and not as "tonight".

Nitrocellulose is an oxygen-negative low explosive, so its decomposition is incomplete combustion:2C12H14O4(NO3)6 -> 18CO + 6CO2 + 14H2O + 12N

Since nitrocellulose was used in mining the carbon monoxide could build up and pose a danger to miners. To remedy this problem, nitrates (potassium nitrate, barium nitrate, ammonium nitrate, etc.) were added into the nitrocellulose to allow for complete combustion.

References

Explosives